The women's 3000 metres steeplechase at the 2012 African Championships in Athletics was held at the Stade Charles de Gaulle on  1 July.

Medalists

Records

Schedule

Results

Final

References

Results

Steeplechase 3000 Women
Steeplechase at the African Championships in Athletics
2012 in women's athletics